The Sittard dialect (in reference to the variety used in Germany) is a Limburgish dialect spoken mainly in the Dutch city of Sittard. It is also spoken in Koningsbosch and in a small part of Germany (Selfkant), but quickly becoming extinct there.

Characteristics

It resembles the Polder Dutch phenomenon in Standard Dutch, though it is extended to the environment before  (where an epenthetic schwa is inserted before the consonant), as in beier  ("beer"). This phenomenon was first examined thoroughly in the first half of the 1940s by Willy Dols, who showed that this Sittard diphthongization typically occurred in syllables with a push tone. New research at the beginning of the 21st century has shown that the diphthongization once served to emphasize the difference in vowel length which distinguishes syllables with a push tone from those with a dragging tone.

Phonology

Vowels

  is restricted to unstressed syllables.

Consonants

Pitch accent

As many other Limburgish dialects, the Sittard dialect features a contrastive pitch accent, with minimal pairs such as goud  'gold' (featuring the push tone) vs. goud  'good' (featuring the dragging tone, transcribed as a high tone). The push tone is realized as a rising-falling contour in the declarative pattern, whereas the dragging tone varies between rising (when the sentence focus falls on the syllable that is non-final) and a shallow rising-falling contour when the syllable is sentence-final. The distinction between the two tones is neutralized outside of the sentence focus. In interrogative sentences, the distinction is always made.

References

Bibliography

 
 

Culture of Limburg (Netherlands)
East Limburgish dialects
Languages of the Netherlands
Low Franconian languages
Sittard-Geleen